Meghan Patrick (born March 25, 1987) is a Canadian country singer-songwriter from Bowmanville, Ontario, signed to Warner Music Canada, and Riser House Entertainment. She released her debut album, Grace & Grit, on April 29, 2016. Patrick counts Bonnie Raitt, Emmylou Harris and Aretha Franklin as her influences. She has one #1 Canada Country hit with "Walls Come Down".

Career
Prior to setting out as a solo artist, Patrick was the lead singer of the Stone Sparrows who released an EP and a full-length album before the members parted ways amicably in 2013 after playing their second Boots and Hearts Music Festival.
 
Since going solo, Patrick signed a recording contract with Warner Music Canada, and a publishing deal with Olé Nashville. Her debut album, Grace & Grit, was released on April 29. In making this album Patrick worked with producers Justin Niebank (Vince Gill, LeAnn Rimes), Vince Gill, Chad Kroeger, Chris Baseford (Nickelback, Avril Lavigne) and Carly McKillip.
 
Patrick is a published songwriter; she has collaborated with Rodney Clawson, Gord Bamford, Chantal Kreviazuk, Marty Dodson, Patricia Conroy, Bruce Wallace, Buddy Owen, Steve Smith, Anthony Anderson, Phil Barton, Phil O'Donnell and Andrew Allan.  Patrick was nominated for Songwriter of the Year with co-writer Chad Kroeger at the 2016 Canadian Country Music Association Awards for her song "Bow Chicka Wow Wow".

In 2016 Patrick was part of the advertising campaign for a new line of Roots Canada clothing.

Patrick has shared the stage with Lady Antebellum, Dwight Yoakam, Jon Pardi Kip Moore, and Gord Bamford.

In 2017, she supported Tom Cochrane on his 25th anniversary tour for his album Mad Mad World. In 2018 she performed in Halifax, Nova Scotia at the Marquee Ballroom.

In June 2021, she released her third studio album, Heart on My Glass. It was her debut American release and include the singles "My First Car" and "Never Giving Up on You", as well as "Cool About It".. Patrick will make her Grand Ole Opry Debut on 4/11/23.

Personal life
Patrick is married to fellow singer Mitchell Tenpenny.

Discography

Albums

Extended plays

Singles

Promotional singles

Guest singles

Other charted songs

Music videos

Awards and nominations

Notes

References

External links

1987 births
Living people
21st-century Canadian women singers
Canadian Country Music Association Female Artist of the Year winners
Canadian Country Music Association Rising Star Award winners
Canadian country singer-songwriters
Canadian women country singers
Juno Award for Country Album of the Year winners
Musicians from Ontario
People from Clarington
Warner Music Group artists